Battle Birds was an American air-war pulp magazine, published by Popular Publications.  It was launched at the end of 1932, but did not sell well, and in 1934 the publisher turned it into an air-war hero pulp titled Dusty Ayres and His Battle Birds, with Robert Sidney Bowen, an established pulp writer, providing a lead novel each month, and also writing the short stories that filled out the issue.  Bowen's stories were set in the future, with the United States menaced by an Asian empire called the Black Invaders.  The change was not a success, and after a year Bowen wrote a novel in which, unusually for pulp fiction, Dusty Ayres finally defeated the invaders, and the magazine ceased publication.  It restarted in 1940, again under the original title, Battle Birds, and lasted for another four years.

Publication history and contents 
In the summer of 1927, Aviation Stories and Mechanics was launched.  It was the first magazine to specialize in fiction about flying, and pulp magazine historian Robert Sampson suggests that Charles Lindbergh's recent flight across the Atlantic was part of the reason for public interest in aviation.  Other magazines quickly appeared, including Air Stories and Wings.  These focused on adventure stories involving flying.  The first magazine to concentrate on aerial warfare was War Birds, which appeared in early 1928.  In 1930 Popular Publications was started by Harry Steeger and Harold Goldsmith, launching four pulp magazines that year, one of which was an air-war pulp titled Battle Aces.  In 1932 they added a second title, Battle Birds, with the first issue dated December 1932. In late 1933 Battle Aces was relaunched as a hero pulp titled G-8 and His Battle Aces, with the lead novels all written by a single author, Robert J. Hogan.

Robert Sidney Bowen, a pulp writer who was selling war fiction prolifically to multiple pulp magazines in the early 1930s, met with Steeger for lunch in 1933.  Bowen was finding it tiresome to quickly write story after story with a different setting for each one, and told Steeger he would like to be the author of a hero pulp magazine, like Hogan.  Steeger agreed, and over lunch they settled on changing Battle Birds, which was selling poorly, to a hero pulp with Bowen as the author.  To avoid having the new magazine compete with G-8 and His Battle Aces, Bowen's stories were all to be set in the future, with America at war with another power; and to avoid having the war against an existing country, they decided to have the enemy be a future power rising in Asia that had conquered the entire world except for the United States.  Bowen's hero was named Dusty Ayres, and the magazine was retitled Dusty Ayres and His Battle Birds starting with the July 1934 issue.  Ayres was America's top pilot, and along with three friends, Jack Horner, Curley Brooks and Biff Bolton, he fought the Asian Black Invaders.  The enemy's leader, Fire Eyes, wore a plain green mask with two slits for eyes, through which sparks of fire could be seen.  His lead pilot, Dusty's frequent antagonist, was known as The Black Hawk.

Bowen also wrote all the short stories for Dusty Ayres, unlike other hero pulps where other authors usually provided the short fiction.  The new magazine did not do well, so after a year Bowen wrote a final novel in which the evil empire was defeated (unusually for a pulp series), and the magazine ceased publication.  It was relaunched five years later under the original Battle Birds title, lasting for another four years in that incarnation.

Robert Lesser, in his history of pulp magazine art, comments that during World War II the air-war magazine artists "realized that they were no longer painting fiction but recording fact", and gives as an example Frederick Blakeslee's cover for the October 1942 cover of Battle Birds, which depicted the US Air Force divebombing Japanese aircraft carriers at the Battle of Midway.  Lesser also quotes a letter to Battle Birds from a US private working as ground crew, asking for a Blakeslee painting that they could hang in their barracks for morale; according to the response in the magazine, Popular agreed and sent them a painting.

Bibliographic details 

Battle Birds was published by Popular Publications, and launched in December 1932.  It began as a monthly, and remained so after the title changed to Dusty Ayres and His Battle Birds in July 1934.  It lasted for twelve issues under the new title; the last two issues were bimonthly, dated May/Jun and July/August 1935.  There was then a gap of several years until February 1940 when the title changed back to Battle Birds.  The next issue, March 1940, inaugurated a bimonthly run that last until the final issue, dated May 1944, with a couple of irregularities: May 1941 was followed by August 1941, and December 1942 was followed by March 1943.  The volume numbering was consecutive until the end of the Dusty Ayres period: there were seven volumes of four issues each, followed by one volume of three issues.  The volume numbering restarted at 1/1 with the February 1940 issue; this time there were five volumes of four issues, and a final volume of six issues.

The magazine was pulp format throughout.  It began at 128 pages and 10 cents, with the price rising to 15 cents in September 1933, and dropping back to 10 cents in February 1940 when the title reverted to Battle Birds.  The page count also dropped at that time, first to 112 pages, and eventually to 82 pages by the final issue.  When the magazine was relaunched in February 1940, it was under Popular's Fictioneers imprint.  The editor for the first run of Battle Birds is not known; Rogers Terrill edited the Dusty Ayres issues, and Harry Steeger edited the magazine from 1940 on. 

In 1965 and 1966, Corinth Books published about fifty paperback editions of novels and short stories drawn from several magazines, including four Dusty Ayres novels, and a collection of Bowen's short stories from the magazine:

 Black Lightning (originally published in the July 1934 issue)
 Crimson Doom (August 1934)
 Purple Tornado (September 1934)
 The Telsa Raiders (July/August 1935)
 Battle Birds Versus the Black Invaders (short stories)

References

Sources 

 
 
 
 
 
 
 

Pulp magazines
Magazines established in 1932
Magazines disestablished in 1944
Magazines published in New York City